Since the foundation of the Philippines Football League in 2017, there have been 1033 goals scored in the four seasons of the Philippines Football League. Ceres–Negros and United City striker Bienvenido Marañón has the most goals with 74, with Kaya–Iloilo forwards Jordan Mintah and Robert Lopez Mendy in second and third with 56 and 49 goals, respectively. 8 different players have scored in every single PFL season so far, with three players winning the Golden Boot. Chima Uzoka and Takashi Odawara hold the record for most clubs scored for, having scored for four different clubs across four seasons. Meanwhile, Mintah also holds the record for most goals scored in a single season, scoring 31 during the 2019 season.

Top goalscorers (all time)
Key
 Bold shows players still playing in the PFL.
 Italics show players still playing professional football in other leagues.
 The list of teams for individual players include all teams that they have scored for.

Top goalscorers (per club)

Top goalscorers (per season)

2017 Season

2018 Season

2019 Season

2020 Season

Hat tricks

Note
(H) – Home ; (A) – Away

4 Player scored four goals

Notes

References

Football in the Philippines